Ross 'Twiggy' Dunne (born 25 February 1948) is a former Australian rules footballer who played for the Collingwood Football Club in the Victorian Football League (VFL). He became famous for kicking the goal in the dying minutes of the 1977 VFL Grand Final to draw the game.

Nicknamed after the famous British model due to his slim frame, Dunne was a versatile, no-fuss player who spent much of his career at centre half-forward.

Dunne made his senior VFL debut in the final round of the 1967 VFL season against  at Moorabbin Oval, lining up on champion full back Bob Murray. The Magpies would lose by 47 points, and despite also being manhandled by Saints ruckman Carl Ditterich, Dunne performed admirably, kicking four goals straight. He was selected for the semi final against eventual grand finalist , again kicking four goals in a 30-point defeat.

Dunne was considered among Collingwood's best players in the club's infamous loss to Carlton in the 1970 VFL Grand Final. What is not well-known is that he had been suffering considerable mental trauma, as his father Frank had passed away on the Monday leading up to the game. 

Dunne also played at least one season in the 1970s for Upwey-Tecoma in the Yarra Valley Mountain District Football League.

References

External links

 Profile at Collingwood Forever

1948 births
Australian rules footballers from Victoria (Australia)
Collingwood Football Club players
Living people